Françoise Brion (born 29 January 1933) is a French film actress. She has appeared in 75 films since 1957. She starred in the 1963 film L'Immortelle, which was entered into the 13th Berlin International Film Festival. She was married to Jacques Doniol-Valcroze.

Selected filmography

 That Night (1958)
 Women Are Like That (1960)
 And Satan Calls the Turns (1962)
 Codine (1963)
 Sweet and Sour (1963)
 L'Immortelle (1963)
 Portuguese Vacation (1963)
 Un monde nouveau (1966)
 To Grab the Ring (1968)
 Alexandre le bienheureux (1968)
 Caravan to Vaccarès (1974)
 Julien Fontanes, magistrat (1981–82)
 Count Max (1991)
 Nelly and Mr. Arnaud (1995)
 Season's Beatings (1999)
 Les Liaisons dangereuses (2003) TV
 Le Divorce (2003)

References

External links

1933 births
Living people
French film actresses
Actresses from Paris
20th-century French actresses
21st-century French actresses